Andrea Törnestam (born in 1991 in Stockholm) was the Swedish council secretary for the Swedish Social Democratic Youth League. She is now a member of the parliament in Sweden.

Andrea Törnestam speech 
On 14 February 2013 Grön Ungdom Stockholms Stad arranged a demonstration against the Russian anti-gay law in Rålambshovsparken, Stockholm. Andrea Törnestam from SSU spoke at the demonstration. A big thank you to Ung Pirat Stockholm who contributed all the technology.

References

1991 births
Living people
Members of the Riksdag from the Social Democrats
21st-century Swedish women politicians